Analysis on fractals or calculus on fractals is a generalization of calculus on smooth manifolds to calculus on fractals.

The theory describes dynamical phenomena which occur on objects modelled by fractals.
It studies questions such as "how does heat diffuse in a fractal?" and "How does a fractal vibrate?"

In the smooth case the operator that occurs most often in the equations modelling these questions is the Laplacian, so the starting point for the theory of analysis on fractals is to define a Laplacian on fractals. This turns out not to be a full differential operator in the usual sense but has many of the desired properties. There are a number of approaches to defining the Laplacian: probabilistic, analytical or measure theoretic.

See also

 Time scale calculus for dynamic equations on a cantor set.
Differential geometry
Discrete differential geometry
Abstract differential geometry

References

External links
 Analysis on Fractals, Robert S. Strichartz - Article in Notices of the AMS
 University of Connecticut - Analysis on fractals Research projects
 Calculus on fractal subsets of real line - I: formulation

Fractals